TV3 is a Ghanaian free-to-air television network in Ghana. Launched in 1997 by Malaysian company Sistem Televisyen Malaysia Berhad, TV3 airs and produces a variety of television programmes including acclaimed news bulletins, dramas and successful reality television and entertainment shows. It was taken over by a Ghanaian company called Media General Ghana Limited in 2011.

TV3 Ghana established itself as the most watched free-to-air television station in Ghana, having achieved 65% nationwide penetration at end-2006 and aiming to reach 90% by 2008. TV3 is a privately owned TV in Ghana.

However, TV3 has experienced major competition in the likes of Metro TV which has succeeded not only in broadcasting its network to all the regions in the country but it also struck a deal with South Africa's MultiChoice allowing it to be broadcast throughout Africa. Despite this, TV3 remains popular for its showing of Mexican telenovelas, Korean series and music and a variety of local and foreign movies. TV3 entertains and educates its viewers through all the programs aired.

Programs

Current

Children's
Ben 10
Generator Rex
LazyTown

Former

Overseas
Beauty and The Beast

Comedy
Home Improvement
Family Feud Africa (localised version, hosted by U.S. host Steve Harvey)

Children's

Aladdin
Barney & Friends
Dennis the Menace
Dennis and Gnasher
Basket Fever
Betty's Voyage
Cedric the Crow
Conan the Adventurer
Dennis and Gnasher
G.I. Joe: A Real American Hero (1983 TV series)
Legends of the Hidden Temple
The Lion King's Timon & Pumbaa
Max Steel
Ocean Girl
Postman Pat
Power Rangers
Roughnecks: Starship Troopers Chronicles
Return to Jupiter
Talented Kids
Teen Wolf
Teletubbies
Thunderstone
Tweenies
Tommy and Oscar

Drama
Desperate Housewives
Hill Street Blues

Reality 

 Date Rush
 Ghana's most beautiful

Staff

Present 

 Berla Mundi
 Giovani Caleb
 Alfred Akrofi Ocansey
 Komla Adom
 Wendy Laryea
 Josephine Antwi Adjei
 Portia Gabor

Past 

 Bridget Otoo
 Nana Aba Anamoah

See also
Media of Ghana

References

External links
TV3 Network Ltd.

Broadcasting in Ghana
Television channels and stations established in 1997
Television stations in Ghana
Mass media in Accra